Armine Yalnizyan is a Canadian economist and writer who was a senior economist with the Canadian Centre for Policy Alternatives from 2008 to 2017. She appeared regularly on CBC TV's Lang and O'Leary Exchange, CBC Radio's Metro Morning, and contributed regularly to the "Economy Lab" at the Globe and Mail. She is currently a fellow with the Atkinson Foundation doing collaborative research on the future of workers in a period of technological change. Her work focuses on "social and economic factors that determine our health and well being". In 2012, the CBC described her as one of Canada's "leading progressive economists".

Early years and education
Yalnizyan was born in Canada. Her parents were Armenian immigrants. Her grandfathers were killed in the Armenian genocide (1914–1923). She grew up in Toronto.

She completed a bilingual honours degree in economics from Glendon College, a York University federated campus in Toronto, Ontario, including  a year of economics at Université de Bordeaux, France. she received a master's degree in Industrial Relations from the University of Toronto in 1985, in labour market policy.

Career
One of Yalnizyan's first jobs as an economist was in the 1980s with the Social Planning Council of Metropolitan Toronto. At that time the economy was struggling with the impact of the 1981–82 recession, and many full-time jobs were being lost. The Council had already documented the de-industrialization of Toronto, and many residents faced inadequate training and income supports given limited job opportunities. This worsened after 1990, as jobless benefits were cut in four rounds of reforms by consecutive Conservative and Liberal federal governments. Yalnizyan documented trends in full- and part-time job opportunities, working hours, incomes and labour adjustment policies, often adding a gendered analysis. She also tracked changes in fiscal policy (public spending cuts and tax cuts). Yalnizyan was a program director from 1987 to 1997, and returned to be the Council as Director of Research in 2006 and 2007. 

In 1998, while working as lead researcher at the Toronto-based Centre for Social Justice, she completed an in-depth 148-page report as part of the Growing Gap Project, entitled "The Growing Gap: Growing Inequality between Rich and Poor in Canada." The Growing Gap Project, which was funded by Atkinson Charitable Foundation the SJC's first major project, documented the increasing income and wealth gap, the moderating role of government and potential public policy alternatives.

Canadian Centre for Policy Alternatives

Yalnizyan began her association with the Canadian Centre for Policy Alternatives in 1993, while still at the Social Planning Council. By 1994, when the centre began to publish their Alternative Federal Budget, she was a research associate. 

In 2008 she joined CCPA as Senior Economist to help develop and advance the Inequality Project. She remained with CCPA until 2017. She was a regular contributor to CCPA's Behind the numbers.

After leaving the CCPA, Yalnizyan worked with the Institute for Fiscal Studies and Democracy, the Mowat Centre and Policy Horizons.

Atkinson Foundation 
On May 13, 2018 the Atkinson Foundation announced that Yalnizyan accepted a two-year fellowship—Atkinson Fellow on the Future of Workers—to for collaborative research on "policy innovation for inclusive economic growth in an era of rapid technological change".[15]

In August 2018 Yalnizyan was asked to be economic policy advisor to Deputy Minister of Employment and Social Development Canada Louise Levonian,[16] where she provided assistance with GBA+ (gender based analysis) and helped in the foresight and stress-testing process critical to ensuring income and labour adjustment programs that work well under different job market scenarios.

When this appointment ended, she resumed the fellowship offered by the Atkinson Foundation, in November 2019. She continues to work on "policy responses to the changing nature of work", but the unique labour market impacts of the COVID-19 pandemic added a new element of urgency to this work: ensuring the she-cession (a term Yalnizyan coined in March 2020[17]) turned into a she-covery.

Media

Globe and Mail 
In 2010, Yalnizyan was invited to join a new Globe and Mail feature, the "Economy Lab", which had Canadian economists write about economic issues in the wake of the global financial crisis of 2008–09.  She contributed regularly to the Economy Lab from 2010 to 2014, and continued to contribute on an occasional basis after 2014.

Metro Morning with Matt Galloway
In 2012 she became a regular bi-weekly business commentator on the CBC's number one morning show Metro Morning at CBLA-FM in Toronto with Matt Galloway which reaches a "million listeners in the Greater Toronto Area."

Lang and O'Leary Exchange

From the fall of 2011 to the last episode of the show at the end of June 2018, Yalnizyan was a weekly guest on the "Big Picture Panel", the longest running continuous feature of CBC-TV's Lang and O'Leary Exchange with Amanda Lang and Kevin O'Leary.

Board memberships

Yalnizyan was Chair of the Employment and Economics Committee of the National Action Committee on the Status of Women in 1989 and 1990, and served on that board until 1995. She served on the board of the Ottawa-based Public Interest Advocacy Centre (PIAC) from 2001 to 2016. She was an Advisory Board member for the Canadian Institutes for Health Research's Institute of Population and Public Health (CIHR/IPPH) from 2009 to 2016. Yalnizyan is a Senior Fellow of Massey College, University of Toronto. She was President of Canadian Association for Business Economics from 2017-2019, Vice President from 2013-2017, and has served on the board since 2005.

Awards
Yalnizyan was honoured with the first Atkinson Economic Justice Award in 2002 and the University of Toronto's Morley Gunderson Prize in 2003. She received the Ontario Public Health Association Award of Excellence in 2011, and the Ontario Municipal Social Services Association's Champion of Human Service Award in 2012. She became a recipient of the Queen Elizabeth II Diamond Jubilee Medal in 2012.

In 2022 Maclean's listed Yalnizyan as in its "Power List: 50 Canadians who are forging paths, leading the debate and shaping how we think and live". She was described as "the caring person's economist: a big-picture thinker who looks out for the little guy."

Themes
By 2010, Yalnizyan had "tracked trends in labour markets, income distribution, government budgets and access to services (particularly training and health care) for over 20 years." Her focus has been on "social and economic factors that determine our health and well being", including Affordable housing in Canada
 poverty in Canada, minimum wage, and basic services. In her 2017 Canadian Centre for Policy Alternatives article on redistribution, Yalnizyan wrote that basic income models were market-based and focused on increasing money to access market freedom and choice. Yalnizyan stressed the health-based basic service approach through which more public services are provided that "are not contingent on income." This would provide "more freedom from the market". She cites as examples, "care provided by publicly insured doctors and hospitals and taxpayer-funded public schools dramatically reduce poverty and inequality."

Publications
In addition to 4 years as regular contributor to the Globe and Mail's Economy Lab, Yalnizyan has published in the Toronto Star, Macleans, National Post, Hill Times, and Canadian Business.
Yalnizyan also contributed to Straight Goods, a Canadian news magazine, that was online from 2000 to 2013, along with Mel Watkins, Stephen Lewis, Linda McQuaig, Aaron Freeman, Gordon Guyatt, Cathy Crowe, Stewart Steinhauer and Charles Gordon.

Controversies
In March 1999, Alberta Premier Ralph Klein sent a letter of complaint to Rod Fraser, the University of Alberta's President after Yalnizyan, who was then at Toronto's Centre for Social Justice, presented a paper at the Parkland Institute's "Poverty Amidst Plenty" conference in which she used Statistics Canada data and the research of two University of Lethbridge academics to argue the gap between rich and poor in Alberta was growing faster than in any other Canadian province "despite a rapidly growing economy". In an immediate response, Klein accused the Parkland Institute of being "factually challenged", "one-sided and ideologically biased." Fraser defended the Parkland Institute and free speech, saying that the "university would not be intimidated by Klein's criticism, and would continue to foster a climate of open debate."

Notes

References

Canadian political journalists
Canadian columnists
University of Toronto alumni
Glendon College alumni
University of Bordeaux alumni
Living people
CBC Television people
Canadian women journalists
Canadian women columnists
Canadian women non-fiction writers
Year of birth missing (living people)
Canadian social commentators
Canadian women economists